Oui Be Negroes is an African-American improvisational sketch comedy ensemble, founded by Artistic Director Shaun Landry and Director Hans Summers. They worked together for years in Chicago with the Underground Theatre Conspiracy, and had thrown around the idea of an African-American-driven sketch and improvisational comedy troupe, which would be geared specifically toward social and political humor.

Before Oui Be Negroes 
The Underground Theatre Conspiracy (UTC) was founded by Hans Summers in 1985 with performers he had worked with at the Players' Workshop of the Second City. In the beginning. the roster of players looked largely like one of the hundreds that could be found in the 1980s performing at any space available on the Northside of Chicago. But the UTC had one major difference, in that they produced the first multimedia comedy in the city. It blended stage performance with prerecorded video material and a live camera. The show with the unlikely title of "Fooglewoogle-The Multi-Media Comedy" was warmly received. "The evening ranges between the security of canned video segments (theater as television) and the insecurity of improv comedy combined with live video segments. It’s an interesting rush to go from the frozen, two-dimensional hilarity of the comedy videos to the wild and crazy stuff generated by these basic improv games." (Lawrence Bommer) Windy City Times

After two successful runs, Shaun Landry was added to the UTC's roster of performers. This came at a time (1986) when Shaun was one of three African Americans performing improv comedy in the city of Chicago. From the very beginning, Shaun was a major force with the UTC. As early as 1987 Shaun and Hans attempted to organize a minority-driven comedy ensemble but without any luck.

Regardless of that, the UTC continued to be a steady force throughout the late 1980s averaging two or more original stage productions a year; "Batman Died for Our Sins,” "A Sweet Home Chicago", "Space, An Exploration of What's Between Us", "Are We Alone and if so Who Are You?" "This group makes you feel good again about something all of us tend to overlook; the mere reason we go to the theatre in the first place; to be entertained. These guys not only go out on the edge, but they also take you there with them. One feels as though they've left the theatre with a virtual doggy bag full of food for thought." (Richard Morris) Performink

In 1990, Hans and Shaun decided to take on the road of relocating the company to Seattle. There they continued to be productive with their brand of humor; “Twin Lakes or Who Killed Laura Petrie", Silence of the Yams or Guess Who We're Having for Dinner", "The Improv Thang" and "Neither David Lynch’s cult sudser nor Dick Van Dyke’s perky TV wife figures into this improvisational comedy revue, but few other subjects are left unmocked by the quick-witted Underground Theatre Conspiracy. Recently transplanted from Chicago, the troupe blitzes through a series of sketches, blackout gags, and running jokes with a winning blend of pointed satire and casual good cheer." (A. J. Mell) Seattle Weekly But when they were asked to produce a show for the Seattle Fringe Festival, what came out was the forerunner of what would become the Oui Be Negroes style of the show. Tales From the Crib was a two-person show that examined interracial issues and turned out to be one of the hits of the festival. At that point, Shaun and Hans felt that the time might be right for a minority company and what better place to kick it off then back home in Chicago.

Birth of Oui Be Negroes 1994-2000 
“Basically, the ‘Oui’ part comes from African Americans who went over to France in the '20s and ‘30s and did very well for themselves, folks like Fats Waller and Josephine Baker. It's homage to that,” Landry says, pausing. “And it's just damn funny.” Landry explains that most people giggle when they hear the name, but now and then, it makes ‘very nice liberal white folks’ just a little nervous." (Patti Hartigan) Boston Globe “For example, “Landry says, “during the O. J.(Simpson) trial we did a game show format called ‘Who do you Blame?’ and the guilty party was always a black man in a stocking cap. African-American audiences are the most responsive. Backstage

In 1993, Landry actively went seeking actors of color and ran upon them at The Second City Outreach Program. There she assembled the original ensemble along with Summers as the lone Caucasian member, they mounted Oui Be Negroes’ first show at Cafe Voltaire in Chicago.

"The big thing was: Be who you are," Landry says. "Don't hold back on anything." In part (with OBN) she hoped to provide an alternative to white-majority teams where black actors could avoid roles that might come off as stereotypical: big mamas, pimps, dice-rolling hustlers, and the like. (Darel Jevens) Chicago Sun-Times

Oui Be Negroes presented the original satirical show with names like "Can We Dance with Yo Dates", "One Drop is All It Takes", "Once You Go Black", "All Coons Look Alike to Me" (inspired by the popular Coon Song of 1896) "The Artists Formerly Known as Oui Be Negroes" and "Absolute Negritude" in Chicago from 1994 through 1999 that explored black culture and history before relocating the troupe to San Francisco.

Intelligent alacrity has always characterized the work of Shaun Landry and Hans Summers, founding members of the comedy troupe Oui Be Negroes. And in their most recent review, these two plus Merle Dandridge and Marvin Howard probe the corners of our culture for satirical humor often overlooked by...or flat-out forbidden to other comedians. (Mary Shen Barnidge) Chicago Reader

OBN has toured all over the United States from New York to Los Angeles to Austin to Boston, in addition to performances outside of the U.S. in Canada and the Netherlands.

Oui Be Negroes in SF 2000-2009 
In the year 2000, Oui Be Negroes relocated from its birthplace in Chicago to San Francisco California. There they continued to produce a sketch and improvisational shows with an edge such as "X", "To Pigmeat Markham Thanks for Everything, Spike Lee" 'Bury James Brown as well as being the house ensemble of The San Francisco Improv Alliance. "their style and attitude, not to mention their threadbare theater, is reminiscent of the legendary San Francisco sketch and improv group from the '60s and '70s, The Committee." (Pat Craig) Contra Costa Times

Oui Be Negroes, Los Angeles 2009- 
In 2009, Landry & Summers made the latest big jump to Los Angeles where they continue to produce Oui Be Negroes show as well as duo performances as Landry & Summers at Improv Olympic West, The Second City LA as well as the Avery Schreiber Theatre in North Hollywood. Their first extended duo show in Los Angeles entitled 'Yes, We Are F**king' played at The Second City LA during the 2009 holiday season. "Their chemistry is just as obvious off-stage as well. In an interview following their opening-night performance, the bubbly Landry – who is frequently mistaken for her friend, “Pine Sol Lady” Diane Amos – and the reserved, serious Summers – who, with his shock of grey hair, looks more like a college professor than an actor and comedian – often finished each other’s thoughts and sentences." Leon Acord - WEHO News

Oui Be Negroes celebrated their 15 Anniversary by returning home to Chicago to perform as part of the 12th Annual Chicago Improv Festival.

Landry & Summers continue to perform their biting style of social and political humor in 2010 with Interraciallicious at M.I.'s Westside Comedy Theater in Santa Monica, CA and as featured act for DuoFest 2010 in Philadelphia, PA. We loved it! The chemistry between the two is wonderful. I was sad to have to say goodnight - we would have loved to have spent hours getting to know these talented actors. – Goldstar Events audience comments about Interraciallicious

References 
Improv Making up for Lost Time by Sam Hurwitt San Francisco Chronicle July 15 2007
 Whose Improv Is It Anyway Beyond the Second City Amy Seham University Press of Mississippi (July 2001)
 Cool As Hell Theater Podcast NPR
Small Theater Sometimes has Big Rewards by Pat Craig Contra Costa Times January 25, 2002
Improving their improv A bunch of comics will share funny feelings in Kansas City's Spontaneous Combustion festival Brian McTavish Arts & Entertainment Writer, Kansas City Star 09-09-97
Oui Shall Overcome: Black improvisers no longer play second fiddle in Chicago by Ed Will Denver Post Staff Writer February 23, 1999
African American Troupe Laughs at Itself by Patti Hartigan, Boston Glob February 7, 1997
DO BE DO BE DO - Chicago Sun Times 02-2007
The Artists Formally Known as Oui Be Negros and The Playground by Jack Helbig - Chicago Reader March 18, 1999

Specific

External links 
 Oui Be Negroes

American comedy troupes
Improvisational troupes
Sketch comedy troupes
African-American culture
African-American arts organizations
Performing groups established in 1993
Organizations based in Chicago
1993 establishments in Illinois